Antonio de Arfian, (fl. 1554–87) was  a 16th-century Spanish painter.

Life
A native of Triana, a suburb of Seville,  he studied under Luis de Vargas. He was employed on several important works, both in fresco and in oil, including  the grand altar-piece of Seville cathedral, which he painted in 1554 in collaboration with Antonio Ruiz.

His dates of his birth and death are unrecorded; it is known that he was still alive in 1587, when, with the assistance of his son Alonzo, he painted the Legend of St. George, in the church of the Magdalene.

References

Sources
 

Year of birth unknown
Year of death unknown
Painters from Seville
16th-century Spanish people